"I Believe" is the debut single of American Idol season three winner Fantasia. The song was co-written by Louis Biancaniello, Sam Watters, and former American Idol contestant Tamyra Gray. Released in the United States on June 15, 2004, "I Believe" debuted at number one on the US Billboard Hot 100, selling 142,000 copies during its first week and winning three Billboard awards. The song also reached number one on the Canadian Singles Chart and number four on Australian ARIA Singles Chart. It was included on Fantasia's debut album, Free Yourself, released on November 23, 2004.

Background

Fantasia sang "I Believe" on the third-season finale of American Idol as her last performance within the competition. Diana DeGarmo, the runner up of American Idol season three, sang the song first, also on the finale, for her first performance of the night. The judges unanimously acclaimed Fantasia the winner of season three, a prediction that came true when she was crowned American Idol the following evening. An ecstatic and tearful Fantasia performed her new single "I Believe" minutes after the announcement. DeGarmo's performance was also well received by the judges.

Release and commercial performance
"I Believe" was released in the United States on June 15, 2004, as a CD single and 7-inch single. The song debuted on the US Billboard Hot 100 at number one, staying there for one week. During its debut week, the single sold 142,000 copies, making it the second debut solo single by a female artist to commence its chart run at number one, following Lauryn Hill's "Doo Wop (That Thing)". It has sold 527,000 copies in the United States as of 2009. "I Believe" was the winner of two Billboard Music Awards and one Billboard American Urban Radio Networks award. In Canada, the song remained atop the Canadian Singles Chart for 10 weeks and was certified double platinum by the Canadian Recording Industry Association (CRIA), shipping more than 80,000 units.

Outside North America, "I Believe" charted in Australia, New Zealand, and Romania. In Australia, the song was issued as a CD single on July 19, 2004. The following week, it debuted at its peak of number four on the ARIA Singles Chart. By doing so, Fantasia became the second American Idol winner to chart in Australia, after Kelly Clarkson debuted on the ARIA chart with "Miss Independent" in 2003. "I Believe" stayed in the top 50 for 11 weeks, ending 2004 as Australia's 85th-best-selling single and earning a gold certification from the Australian Recording Industry Association (ARIA) for shipping over 35,000 copies. In New Zealand, the song charted on the RIANZ Singles Chart for five weeks, peaking at number 20 for two weeks in August 2004. On the Romanian Top 100, the single charted for one week, appearing at number 93 on July 19, 2004.

Awards

Track listings
US, Canadian, and Australian CD single
 "I Believe"
 "Chain of Fools"
 "Summertime"

US 7-inch single
A. "I Believe"
B. "Summertime"

Credits and personnel
Credits are lifted from the US CD single liner notes.

Studios
 Recorded at NRG Studios (North Hollywood, California), Homesite 13 (Novato, California), and the Record Plant (Hollywood, California)
 Mixed at Homesite 13 (Novato, California)

Writing and production

 Tamyra Gray – writing, background vocals
 Sam Watters – writing, background vocals, production, arrangement
 Louis Biancaniello – writing, keyboards, programming, production, arrangement, mixing
 Steve Churchyard – string session engineering
 Mark Kiczula – assistant string engineering
 Ross Hogarth – choir session engineering
 Brian Scheuble – choir session engineering
 Jun Ishizeki – assistant choir engineering

Vocals

 Fantasia – vocals
 Maxi Anderson – choir
 Eric Butler – choir
 Debra Byrd – choir
 Nick Cooper – choir
 Kevin Dorsey – choir
 Angela Fisher – choir
 Sybil Harris – choir
 Darlene Koldenhoven – choir
 Byron Motley – choir
 Bobbi Page – choir
 Deborah Sharpe-Taylor – choir
 Melanie Taylor – choir
 Tony Wilkins – choir
 Terry Wood – choir
 Yvonne Williams – choir

Orchestra

 David Campbell – string arrangement, conducting
 Joel Derouin – violin
 Darius Campo – violin
 Mario DeLeon – violin
 Berj Garabedian – violin
 Armen Garabedian – violin
 Larry Greenfield – violin
 Julian Hallmark – violin
 Natalie Leggett – violin
 Alyssa Park – violin
 Sara Parkins – violin
 Bob Peterson – violin
 John Wittenberg – violin
 Evan Wilson – viola
 Matt Funes – viola
 Larry Corbett – cello
 Dan Smith – cello

Charts

Weekly charts

Year-end charts

Certifications

Release history

See also
 List of Billboard Hot 100 number-one singles of 2004
 List of number-one singles of 2004 (Canada)

References

19 Recordings singles
2004 debut singles
2004 songs
American Idol songs
Billboard Hot 100 number-one singles
Canadian Singles Chart number-one singles
Fantasia Barrino songs
J Records singles
Song recordings produced by Sam Watters
Songs written by Louis Biancaniello
Songs written by Sam Watters
Syco Music singles